Mohawks of Kahnawà:ke are a Mohawk First Nation in Quebec, Canada. In 2016 the band has a registered population of 10,946 members. Its main reserve is Kahnawake 14, located on the south shore of the St. Lawrence River opposite Montreal. It also shares the uninhabited reserve of Doncaster 17 with the Mohawks of Kanesatake for hunting and fishing. The band is governed by the Mohawk Council of Kahnawà:ke.

Demographics 
The members of Kahnawà:ke First Nation are Mohawk. In October 2016, the band had a total registered population of 10,946 members, 2,959 of whom lived off reserve.

Geography 

The band of Kahnawà:ke lives primarily on a reserve, Kahnawake 14, located 8 km southwest of Montreal, Quebec. This reserve covers an area of 4,825 ha. The band also shares an uninhabited reserve, Doncaster 17, located 16 km northeast of Sainte-Agathe-des-Monts with the Mohawks of Kanesatake for hunting and fishing. The First Nation is headquartered at Kahnawake. The closest major city is Montreal.

Governance 

The Mohawk of Kahnawà:ke are governed by a band council, called Mohawk Council of Kahnawà:ke. Members are elected to three-year terms according to a custom electoral system based on Section 11 of the Indian Act.

Current council 
Appointed in July 2021, for a term lasting until June 2024, the current chief and council are:

 Grand Chief Kahsennenhawe Sky-Deer
 Ietsénhaienhs Jessica Lazare
 Ratsénhaienhs Arnold Boyer
 Ratsénhaienhs Michael Delisle Jr.
 Ratsénhaienhs Cody Diabo
 Ratsénhaienhs Bart Goodleaf
 Ratsénhaienhs Lindsay Leborgne
 Ietsénhaienhs Tonya Perron
 Ratsénhaienhs Ross Montour
 Ratsénhaienhs Ryan Montour
 Ratsénhaienhs Alan John Rice
 Ratsénhaienhs Harry Rice

Electoral history

2018 
The 2018 elections were held on Saturday, 7 July (Ohiarihkó:wa).

2015 
The 2015 elections were held on Saturday, 20 June (Ohiarí:ha).

2012 
The 2012 elections were held on Saturday, 7 July (Ohiarihkó:wa).

2009 
The 2009 elections were held on Saturday, 4 July at Kateri School.

2006 
The 2006 elections were held on Saturday, 1 July (Ohiari'kó:wa).

See also 

 Kahnawake
 Mohawk people

References

External links 
 Official website of the Mohawk Council of Kahnawà:ke
 First Nation Detail by Indigenous and Northern Affairs Canada

First Nations in Quebec
First Nations governments
Mohawks of Kahnawá:ke